PS Telegraph was a paddle steamer passenger vessel operated by the London and North Western Railway from 1859 to 1874.

History

She was built by J & G Thomson of Govan for the Belfast Steamship Company, and in 1856 passed to the Chester and Holyhead Railway, which was taken over by the London and North Western Railway in 1859.

She ran aground on 27 January 1881 at Cooley Point, Ireland. She was salvaged but was beyond economical repair and scrapped in the same year.

References

1853 ships
Passenger ships of the United Kingdom
Steamships
Ships built on the River Clyde
Ships of the London and North Western Railway
Paddle steamers of the United Kingdom